Zabrus ignavus is a species of ground beetle in the Pterostichinae subfamily that can be found in Bulgaria, France, Greece, Italy, Kosovo, Montenegro, Portugal, Serbia, Slovenia, Spain, Voivodina, on islands such as Balearic, Corsica, Gibraltar, Sardinia, and Sicily, and in Morocco.

References

Beetles described in 1907
Beetles of North Africa
Beetles of Europe
Zabrus
Taxa named by Ernő Csíki